Law of the Land is an Australian television drama series that screened on the Nine Network from 1993–1999. The series was set in the fictional country town of Merringanee and centered on the unique way that locals dealt with and enforced the law.

The series was created by Ro Hume and Sue Masters and produced by Bruce Best, Matt Carroll, Richard Clendinnen and Terrie Vincent.

Cast
 Lisa Hensley – Kate Chalmers
 David Roberts – Peter Lawrence
 Wyn Roberts – Hamilton Chalmers
 Richard Moir – Sergeant Clive O'Connor
 David Walters – Sean O'Connor
 Angelo D'Angelo – Sergeant Marc Rosetti
 Debbie Byrne – Jean Jardine
 Tamblyn Lord – David Jardine
 Lindy Wallis – Trish Miles
 Shane Connor – Harry Miles
 Radha Mitchell – Alicia Miles
 Abbie Holmes – Audrey O'Connor
 Peter O'Brien – Andy Cochrane
 Frances O'Connor – Marissa Green
 Alexandra Fowler – Jacqui Rushcutter
 Fiona Spence – Magistrate Maggie Mulcahy
 Rebecca Frith – Alex Lentini
 Tessa Humphries – Hannah Scott
 Mike Bishop – Ray Richmond
 Michael O'Neill – Michael Delaney
 Sapidah Kian – Shirin Rasidi
 Bruce Hughes – Nick Rogers
 Karmen Raspovic – Heather Coleman

Episodes

Season One

Season Two

Season Three

Season Four

Home Media 
There Never been a VHS, DVD or Blu-Ray Release of Law of the Land.

See also
 Lex loci – the Legal Latin phrase for conflicts of law
 List of Australian television series

External links
 

Australian drama television series
Nine Network original programming
Australian legal television series
1993 Australian television series debuts
1999 Australian television series endings